The Cannibal Club was a Victorian dining club associated with the Anthropological Society of London, likely founded at the same time in 1863 by Sir Richard Francis Burton and Dr James Hunt. The club met in Bartolini's dining rooms near Fleet Street, London. Its official symbol was a mace carved to look like an African head gnawing on a human thighbone. The club's name is thought to derive from Burton's interest in cannibalism which he regretted that he never witnessed on his travels. Club members included: Richard Monkton Milnes, Charles Bradlaugh, Thomas Bendyshe, Algernon Swinburne, Sir James Plaisted Wilde, General Studholme John Hodgson and Charles Duncan Cameron.

In his biography of Burton, Dane Kennedy suggests that "the very name of the new club signaled the determination of its organizers to create an atmosphere where subjects deemed deviant by society could receive an open airing" and to liberate its participants from "the sober, 'scientific' etiquette that governed the proceedings of the Anthropological Society."

Burton's brother-in-law and father-in-law attended the club's meetings which he facetiously referred to as "orgies." Kennedy argues that the club's function has been widely misunderstood. The Cannibal Cathechism – written by Swinburne for the club – as well as the club's membership, suggest that the dinners served as an opportunity for renowned radicals and social misfits to air their views: "The Cannibal Club was much more than a meeting place for homosocial merriment; it was in fact a venue for venting what were considered at the time subversive opinions about religion, race, sex, and much more."

References

Bibliography
Kennedy, Dane (2005) The Highly Civilized Man: Richard Burton and the Victorian World, Harvard University Press, 
Lovell, Mary S (1998) A Rage to Live: A Biography of Richard and Isabel Burton, London: Abacus, 

Dining clubs
Learned societies of the United Kingdom
Organizations established in 1863